In computer security, coordinated vulnerability disclosure, or "CVD" (formerly known as responsible disclosure) is a vulnerability disclosure model in which a vulnerability or an issue is disclosed to the public only after the responsible parties have been allowed sufficient time to patch or remedy the vulnerability or issue. This coordination distinguishes the CVD model from the "full disclosure" model.

Developers of hardware and software often require time and resources to repair their mistakes. Often, it is ethical hackers who find these vulnerabilities. Hackers and computer security scientists have the opinion that it is their social responsibility to make the public aware of vulnerabilities. Hiding problems could cause a feeling of false security. To avoid this, the involved parties coordinate and negotiate a reasonable period of time for repairing the vulnerability. Depending on the potential impact of the vulnerability, the expected time needed for an emergency fix or workaround to be developed and applied and other factors, this period may vary between a few days and several months.

Coordinated vulnerability disclosure may fail to satisfy security researchers who expect to be financially compensated. At the same time, reporting vulnerabilities with the expectation of compensation is viewed by some as extortion. While a market for vulnerabilities has developed, vulnerability commercialization (or "bug bounties") remains a hotly debated topic. Today, the two primary players in the commercial vulnerability market are iDefense, which started their vulnerability contributor program (VCP) in 2003, and TippingPoint, with their zero-day initiative (ZDI) started in 2005. These organizations follow the coordinated vulnerability disclosure process with the material bought. Between March 2003 and December 2007 an average 7.5% of the vulnerabilities affecting Microsoft and Apple were processed by either VCP or ZDI. Independent firms financially supporting coordinated vulnerability disclosure by paying bug bounties include Facebook, Google, and Barracuda Networks.

Disclosure policies 
Google Project Zero has a 90-day disclosure deadline which starts after notifying vendors of vulnerability, with details shared in public with the defensive community after 90 days, or sooner if the vendor releases a fix.

ZDI has a 120-day disclosure deadline which starts after receiving a response from the vendor.

Examples
Selected security vulnerabilities resolved by applying coordinated disclosure:
 MD5 collision attack that shows how to create false CA certificates, 1 week
 Starbucks gift card double-spending/race condition to create free extra credits, 10 days (Egor Homakov)
 Dan Kaminsky discovery of DNS cache poisoning, 5 months
 MBTA vs. Anderson, MIT students find vulnerability in the Massachusetts subway security, 5 months
 Radboud University Nijmegen breaks the security of the MIFARE Classic cards, 6 months
 The Meltdown vulnerability, hardware vulnerability affecting Intel x86 microprocessors and some ARM-based microprocessors, 7 months.
 The Spectre vulnerability, hardware vulnerability with implementations of branch prediction affecting modern microprocessors with speculative execution, allowing malicious processes access to the mapped memory contents of other programs, 7 months.
 The ROCA vulnerability, affecting RSA keys generated by an Infineon library and Yubikeys, 8 months.

See also
 Information sensitivity
 White hat (computer security)
 Computer emergency response team
 Critical infrastructure protection

External links
 The CERT Guide to Coordinated Vulnerability Disclosure
 CISA Coordinated Vulnerability Disclosure (CVD) Process
 Microsoft's Approach to Coordinated Vulnerability Disclosure
 Dutch National Cyber Security Centre Coordinated Vulnerability Disclosure Guideline
 Hewlett-Packard Coordinated Vulnerability Disclosure policy
 Linksys Coordinated Vulnerability Disclosure Program
 Global Forum on Cyber Expertise Coordinated Vulnerability Disclosure policy
 Philips coordinated vulnerability disclosure statement
 ETSI Coordinated Vulnerability Disclosure policy

References

Computer security procedures
Disclosure